Dominion is the second full-length album released in 1997 by the American power metal band Kamelot. It was the last album to feature original vocalist Mark Vanderbilt and founding drummer Richard Warner. The album was re-released by Sanctuary Records in 2007.

Track listing

Personnel 
All information from the album booklet.

Kamelot
Mark Vanderbilt – lead vocals
Thomas Youngblood – guitars, backing vocals
David Pavlicko – keyboards
Glenn Barry – bass guitar
Richard Warner – drums

Production
Jim Morris – production, engineer
Dave Wehner – assistant engineer
Brian Benscoter – assistant engineer
Steve Heritage – assistant engineer
Buni Zubaly – photography
Derek Gores – artwork, design 
Rachel Youngblood – graphic consultation

References

External links
 Dominion at the official Kamelot website

1997 albums
Kamelot albums
Noise Records albums
Albums recorded at Morrisound Recording